Public service law may refer to:

United Kingdom public service law
Public service law in the United States
Public Service Law, one of the chapters of the Consolidated Laws of New York